Ayanot (lit. Fountains) is a youth village in central Israel. Located near Ness Ziona, it falls under the jurisdiction of Gan Raveh Regional Council.

Etymology
The village was named after the numerous springs in the area, though other sources claim it is taken from Deuteronomy ; "For the LORD thy God bringeth thee into a good land, a land of brooks of water, of fountains and depths, springing forth in valleys and hills." The Jewish National Fund wrote in 1949 that the name is derived from the Arabic.

History
The village was established on 30 March 1930, though no-one lived on the site until Maimon, ten girls and a guard moved in on 12 January 1932; until then they had lived in nearby Ness Ziona.

During World War II, the village became an agricultural school and took in young Holocaust survivors who had succeeded in immigrating. Today it is home to a boarding school for 180 pupils. A few years ago, the agricultural school opened a miniature horse farm and one of its horses was a runner-up in the 2008 world championship for miniature horses.

In 2010, the village celebrated its 80th anniversary.

Gallery

References

External links

Youth villages in Israel
Populated places established in 1930
Jewish villages in Mandatory Palestine
Populated places in Central District (Israel)
1930 establishments in Mandatory Palestine